Ali Benarbia (born 8 October 1968) is an Algerian former professional footballer who played as a midfielder, he is a TV presenter for Al Jazeera Sports in Doha.

As a player he was a midfielder who notably spent time playing in Ligue 1 and the Premier League between 1995 and 2003 playing with Monaco, Bordeaux, Paris Saint-Germain and Manchester City. He also had spells with Martigues, Al-Rayyan and Qatar SC. He was capped seven times by Algeria between 2000 and 2001.

Benarbia is fondly remembered for his time at Manchester City, and was nicknamed "The Algerian Magician".

Early life 
Ali Benarbia was born in Oran, Algeria, with his family originating from Sidi Bel Abbès. When he was only a year old, the family settled in south of France. It was not long before the young Ali started kicking a ball around on the streets.

Club career 
Benarbia grabbed the attention of district side ROC Narbonne at only 10 years and seven years later he signed for FC Martigues. Encouraged by his father, Benarbia wanted to have a professional career in the game but knew that it would only come through hard-work. Playing in the youth team, Benarbia was quickly promoted to the first team in 1987 and went on to help the club into the French first division after winning the second division title in 1993. He was part of the side that was promoted to Ligue 1 in 1993, operating as a midfielder.

Monaco 
After Martigues were relegated in 1995, Benarbia was signed by AS Monaco and two seasons later he helped the club to a league title. In season 1997–98, he was named Player of the Year in the France but still no call came from the French coach. Bénarbia had turned down several offers to play for his home country of Algeria, as he had always hoped to play for France. Benarbia also played in Jean Tigana's talented Monaco side which famously put Manchester United out of the Champions League in 1998 on away goals after a 1–1 draw at Old Trafford.

Bordeaux 
After three seasons with AS Monaco, Benarbia moved to Bordeaux for £1 million and helped the club, where Zinedine Zidane made his name to the league title. With Benarbia playing the best football of his career, Paris Saint-Germain tabled an offer of £2 million for the Algerian player only a month before the end of the season, the club accepted but the deal was kept quiet until Bordeaux had clinched the title.

Paris Saint-Germain 
Benarbia was named captain of the PSG side, which featured Nigerian Jay-Jay Okocha and later Nicolas Anelka. The team failed to win anything, though they did manage to qualify for the second round of the 2000–01 UEFA Champions League, finishing last in their group with Deportivo de La Coruña, Galatasaray S.K. and A.C. Milan.

Manchester City 
Benarbia left France in 2001 and was signed on a free transfer by Manchester City, whose manager Kevin Keegan was familiar with him from when he scored two goals for Monaco against Keegan's Newcastle United. He became a firm favourite amongst the supporters as City won the First Division and promotion back to the Premier League, winning the club's player of the year award and being named in the select side for the Division. He was made captain the following season, although he found the pace of the Premier League harder and was much less influential in his second season. He played his final game in a City shirt in 2003 against FC Barcelona in a game to mark the opening of the City of Manchester Stadium, before announcing his retirement.

Al-Rayyan 
Only five days after this announcement, on 27 July 2003, Benarbia signed up to play for Al-Rayyan of Qatar. After two years with the club, he moved on to play for Nadi Qatar before announcing his retirement a year later.

International career 
Benarbia was first approached by the Algerian Football Federation in 1986. In a rare interview with French website LeButeur published in 2009, Benarbia said that he never refused to play for Algeria. He stated that he was unhappy with the lack of professionalism within the national team and wanted the Federation to provide assurances for professional footballers' safety. During the time of Benarbia's playing career, Algeria struggled with political situations such as the 1986 oil price collapse, Black October and the Algerian Civil War.

He made his début in a 2002 African Cup of Nations Group 4 qualifying game against Burkina Faso in September 2000. He represented Algeria a total of seven times, participating in; three World Cup qualifying games, two Africa Cup of Nations Cup qualifiers and two friendlies.

Honours 
FC Martigues
 Division 2: 1992–93

Monaco
 Division 1: 1996–97
 Trophée des Champions: 1997

Bordeaux
 Division 1: 1998–99

Paris Saint-Germain
 UEFA Intertoto Cup: 2001

Manchester City
 Football League First Division: 2001–02

Individual
 French Division 1 Player of the Year: 1998–99
 PFA Team of the Year First Division: 2001–02
 Manchester City Player of the Year: 2001–02

References

External links 
 

1968 births
Living people
Footballers from Oran
Association football midfielders
Algerian footballers
Algeria international footballers
Algerian emigrants to France
Algerian expatriate footballers
Algerian expatriate sportspeople in France
Algerian expatriate sportspeople in Qatar
Expatriate footballers in England
Expatriate footballers in France
Expatriate footballers in Qatar
FC Martigues players
AS Monaco FC players
FC Girondins de Bordeaux players
Paris Saint-Germain F.C. players
Manchester City F.C. players
Qatar SC players
Ligue 1 players
Ligue 2 players
Premier League players
Qatar Stars League players